The 1942 Iowa State Cyclones football team represented Iowa State College of Agricultural and Mechanic Arts (later renamed Iowa State University) in the Big Six Conference during the 1942 college football season. Under head coaches Ray Donels (first three games) and Mike Michalske (final six games), the Cyclones compiled a 3–6 record (1–4 against conference opponents), tied for last place in the conference, and were outscored by opponents by a combined total of 177 to 94. They played their home games at Clyde Williams Field in Ames, Iowa.

Royal Lohry was the team captain. Back Paul Darling was selected as a first-team all-conference player.

Schedule

References

Iowa State
Iowa State Cyclones football seasons
Iowa State Cyclones football